Cibola Burn is a 2014 science fiction novel by James S. A. Corey (pen name of Daniel Abraham and Ty Franck) and the fourth book in The Expanse series. It follows the crew of the Rocinante as they join the flood of humanity out into the galaxy, using the gates built by the ancient civilization that also produced the protomolecule.
At the release of Cibola Burn, Orbit Books announced that James S. A. Corey would write three additional books in the series (adding to two that were already planned) to bring the series to nine novels and various short stories. Cibola Burn serves as the basis for the fourth season of the television series The Expanse, which was released by Amazon Video December 13, 2019.

Plot summary
After the events of Abaddon's Gate, humanity has gained entry to thousands of new worlds and solar systems through the gate networks. At the start of Cibola Burn the United Nations, Martian and Outer Planets Alliance governments have thus far restricted exploration and colonization efforts to one corporate scientific survey mission to one of these planets. Complicating matters is the existence of a colonial settlement already on the planet from before the military blockade of the rings came into effect. Both sides claim ownership in a confrontation reflecting many colonial interactions throughout history. Jim Holden is sent to mediate the interactions between the colonists and scientists when political and racial tensions culminate in violence.

Still dogged by the disembodied presence of Miller, who wishes to investigate the disappearance of the planet's former inhabitants, Holden arrives on a world on the verge of war. Yet the biggest danger to the colonists, scientists and Holden is not the human disagreements that they have brought with them but the frontier. As with the settling of the American West and many colonial projects of Earth's past, the frontier into which humanity has ventured is vast, uncontrolled and full of dangers. When a mysterious disease and horrific disaster strike at the same time and threaten the lives of the colonists and those in orbit, Holden and Miller must brave the ruins of an alien civilization in search of the one thing that might save them all.

Characters

 Basia Merton is one of the refugees from Ganymede refused safe harbor in the Solar System. His ship pushed through the gate to be the first to settle a new planet. Called Ilus by the inhabitants, they found a rich vein of lithium that could provide a valuable trading commodity with other systems. The United Nations sends a scientific party to the planet with a legal charter to the land. This drives Basia to actions he never thought he would do, and it seems like he has a never-ending set of decisions between bad choices, while he's only trying to do what he thinks is best for his family.
 Elvi Okoye is a scientist on the team sent by the United Nations. Her original task was to try to survey the planet in a pristine state but events make that impossible. Later, she tries to gain insight into the incredible things happening on the planet that make it seem like the most hospitable biosphere found away from Earth may kill them all.
 Dmitri Havelock was Miller's partner on Ceres and is now deputy security chief for the UN mission to New Terra. Remaining aboard the ship that brought him while the security chief relocates to the surface, he becomes increasingly concerned about the actions of his supervisor. Later, the fortunate capture of a prisoner from the Rocinante sets a chain of events into motion with long-term repercussions for humanity.
 James Holden Sensing trouble brewing on Ilus/New Terra, Chrisjen Avasarala sees the need for someone perceived as unbiased to negotiate and report on events there and chooses Jim Holden. After making the journey, the crew tries their best to balance colonial claims, government priority and the awakening creatures on the planet within a crisis greater than all their earlier concerns.
 Joe Miller is still trying to figure out his role within the alien construct, while maintaining his connection with Holden. Eventual clues come together allowing him to shut down the alien machinery and potentially save everyone. However, both the remnants of Miller and The Investigator are killed in the process.

Reception
Publishers Weekly gave Cibola Burn a starred review and called it "splendid".

References

External links
 
 The series' web site 

The Expanse
2014 American novels
American science fiction novels
Space opera novels
Novels set on Mars
Novels by James S. A. Corey
Orbit Books books